Proserpine is a rural town and locality in the Whitsunday Region, Queensland, Australia.

Geography 
Proserpine is situated on the Bruce Highway.

Proserpine is located on the North Coast line with Proserpine railway station located in Hinschen Street in the town centre.

The town is located along the banks of the Proserpine River and is immediately surrounded by floodplains used for sugarcane and cattle farming. Clarke Range is located to the west, Dryander National Park is to the north, and to the east is Conway National Park.

The Clarke Range to the west of the town contains the small former gold mining town of Dittmer.

Proserpine is locally governed by Whitsunday Regional Council, a product of amalgamation of the former Shire of Whitsunday with the former Shire of Bowen. Proserpine is situated within the Queensland electorate of Whitsunday, and  the federal electorate of Dawson.

History 
The Gia people are the traditional custodians of the Proserpine area. Giya (also known as Kia) is a language of North Queensland. The Giya language region includes the landscape within the local government boundaries of the Whitsunday Regional Council, particularly the towns of Bowen and Proserpine.

George Elphinstone Dalrymple named the Proserpine River on an expedition in 1859. Proserpine derives from the legend of the Greek goddess Persephone (whose Latin name is Proserpine), named as such due to Dalrymple's perception that the area was exceptionally fertile, and Persephone being the goddess of spring.

The first British colonists arrived in the early 1860s with Daniel Emmerson forming the Proserpine pastoral station. Frederick Bode and William Dangar took up land at Bromby Park and Goorganga Creek, while Charles Bradley and James Colling established properties along the Gregory River. 

In 1866, Inspectors John Marlow and John Isley of the Native Police, a government funded paramilitary organisation, conducted patrols through the Proserpine area. They and their troopers "dispersed" around six "large mobs" of Aboriginal people during this mission. Marlow used Daniel Emmerson's property for his stock-yard and bought horses from him.

The Crystal Brook Sugar Company was formed in 1882 and established a sugar industry in the region a year later. A sugar mill was built and the labouring on the plantation was performed by imported South Sea Islanders. In 1893 the plantation, which was located at Glen Isla close to the present Proserpine township, was closed and smaller sugar farms run by white owner-operators were established.

Proserpine Lower Provisional School opened on 16 August 1897. In 1904, it was renamed Proserpine Provisional School, becoming Proserpine State School on 15 March 1906. 

St Catherine's Catholic School was established in 1925 by the Sisters of Mercy. It is named in honour of St Catherine of Alexandria..In 1944, the Australian Field Experimental Station was constructed at Gunyarra just south of the town. It was constructed to test and research the effectiveness of Mustard Gas in tropical conditions.

Proserpine Airport (now Whitsunday Coast Airport) opened in 1951.

Proserpine State High School opened on 29 January 1963. Initially the school operated from single building but a second building was constructed during 1963.

The dam was completed in 1990. 

In March 2017, Proserpine suffered extensive damage from Cyclone Debbie.

Heritage listings
Heritage-listed sites include:
 Herbert Street: Proserpine Hospital
 Main Street: St Paul's Anglican Church

Demographics

Economy 
One of the town's main industries is sugar production.

A sugar mill was established in 1897 and is now recognised as one of the most modern sugar mills in the world.

Education 
Proserpine State School is a public primary school for boys and girls. In 2018, the school had an enrolment of 565 students with 45 teachers,   

St Catherine's Catholic College is a Catholic primary and secondary school. It has two campuses. In 2018, the school had an enrolment of 623 students with 59 teachers.

Proserpine State High School is a government secondary school.  In 2018, the school had an enrolment of 1,062 students.

Facilities 
The Proserpine Hospital in Taylor St is the primary health service for the Whitsunday Region .

Amenities 
The Proserpine Entertainment Centre is at 14 Main Street. In March 2022, it reopened after being rebuilt following damage caused by Tropical Cyclone Debbie in March 2017.

The Proserpine Library opened in 1998.

Climate 
The town has a dry-winter humid subtropical climate (Köppen climate classification: Cwa), similar to nearby Mackay.

Notable people 
 Sam Faust, Australian professional rugby league player. 
 Andrew Fraser, Queensland State Politician. 
 Max Grosskreutz, Australian speedway rider.
Billy Sing, Australian sniper during the Gallipoli Campaign of World War I
 Travis Waddell, Australian professional rugby league footballer, plays for Newcastle Knights

See also

List of tramways in Queensland

References

Further reading

  — full text available

External links

 
 Whitsunday Regional Council
 Proserpine Museum
 Town map, 1972

 
Towns in Queensland
Whitsunday Region
Localities in Queensland